This is the discography for Mexican pop singer Ana Bárbara.

Albums

Studio albums

Compilation albums

Singles

Guest appearances

Production and songwriting credits and vocal contributions

Music videos

References 

Discographies of Mexican artists
Regional Mexican music discographies